Edison Ndreca (born 5 July 1994) is an Albanian professional footballer who plays as a left-back for Albanian club FK Kukësi in the Kategoria Superiore.

Club career
Ndreca was a member of the KF Laçi under-19 side for 2 years between 2011 and 2013, where he featured in 52 games and scored 13 goals, which earned him a promotion to the senior team ahead of the 2013–14 season.

On 2 June 2018, Ndreca agreed personal terms and joined Teuta until June 2020. After only six months and limited with playing time, Ndreca joined KS Kastrioti in January 2019.

Career statistics

Honours
Laçi
 Albanian Cup: 2014–15

References

External links
FSHF profile

1994 births
Living people
People from Mirditë
Albanian footballers
Association football fullbacks
KF Laçi players
KS Burreli players
Besëlidhja Lezhë players
KF Teuta Durrës players
KS Kastrioti players
KF Bylis Ballsh players
FK Kukësi players
Kategoria Superiore players
Kategoria e Parë players